Government of Kerala is the subnational government of the Indian state of Kerala. The government is led by a chief minister, who selects all the other ministers. The chief minister and their most senior ministers belong to the supreme decision-making committee, known as the cabinet.

Ministers of the Kerala Government are responsible to the Kerala Legislative Assembly; they make statements in the assembly and take questions from members of the assembly. The government is dependent on Kerala Legislative Assembly to make primary legislation. Legislative assembly elections are held every five years to elect a new assembly, unless there is a successful vote of no confidence in the government or a two-thirds vote for a snap election in the assembly, in which case an election may be held sooner. After an election, the governor selects as chief minister the leader of the party most likely to command the confidence of the assembly, usually by possessing a majority of MLAs.

Under the Indian constitution, executive authority lies with the governor, although this authority is exercised only by, or on the advice of, the chief minister and the cabinet. In most cases, the cabinet members exercise power directly as leaders of the government departments, though some cabinet positions are sinecures to a greater or lesser degree.

Executive branches

Kerala Council of Ministers 

Like in other Indian states, the executive arm of the state is responsible for the day-to-day management of the state. It consists of the governor, the chief minister and the Council of Ministers. The chief minister and the council of ministers also have been appointed by the governor. The governor summons prorogues and dissolves the legislature. He can close the legislative assembly on the recommendation of the chief minister. Judiciary has been separated from the executive in Kerala like other Indian states.

The executive authority is headed by the Chief Minister of Kerala, who is the de facto head of state and is vested with most of the executive powers; the Legislative Assembly's majority party leader is appointed to this position by the Governor. The present Chief Minister is Pinarayi Vijayan, who took office on 25 May 2016. Generally, the winning party decides the chief minister. In many cases, the party focuses a chief ministerial candidate during the election.

The Council of Ministers, which answers to the Legislative Assembly, has its members appointed by the Governor; the appointments receive input from the Chief Minister. They are collectively responsible to the legislative assembly of the State. Generally, the winning party and its chief minister chooses the ministers list and submit the list for the Governor's approval.

Governor 

The governor is appointed by the President for a term of five years. The executive and legislative powers lie with the Chief Minister and his council of ministers, who are appointed by the governor. The governors of the states and territories of India have similar powers and functions at the state level as that of the president of India at the national level. Only Indian citizens above 35 years of age are eligible for appointment. Governors discharge all constitutional functions, such as the appointment of the chief minister, sending reports to the president about failure of constitutional machinery in a state, or with respect to issues relating to the assent to a bill passed by legislature, exercise or their own opinion.

Arif Mohammad Khan is the present governor.

The governor enjoys many different types of powers:
Executive powers related to administration, appointments, and removals
Legislative powers related to lawmaking and the state legislature
Discretionary powers to be carried out according to the discretion of the governor

Legislative branch 

The legislature comprises the governor and the legislative assembly, which is the highest political organ in the state. The governor has the power to summon the assembly or to close the same. All members of the legislative assembly are directly elected, normally once in every five years by the eligible voters who are above 18 years of age. The current assembly consists of 140 elected members and one member nominated by the governor from the Anglo-Indian community. The elected members select one of its own members as its chairman who is called the speaker. The speaker is assisted by the deputy speaker who is also elected by the members. The conduct of a meeting in the house is the responsibility of the speaker.

The main function of the assembly is to pass laws and rules. Every bill passed by the house has to be finally approved by the governor before it becomes applicable.

The normal term of the legislative assembly is five years from the date appointed for its first meeting. But while a proclamation of state of emergency is in operation, the said period will be extended by Parliament by Laws for a period not exceeding one year at a time.

Administrative divisions 

Kerala State has been divided into 14 districts, 27 revenue divisions, 14 district panchayats, 75 taluks, 152 CD blocks, 1453 revenue villages, 941 Gram panchayats, 6 corporations and 87 municipalities.  The business of the state government is transacted through the various secretariat departments based on the rules of business. Each department consists of secretary to the government, who is the official head of the department and such other under secretaries, junior secretaries, officers, and staffs subordinate to him/her. The Chief secretary superintending control over the whole secretariat and staff attached to the ministers.

The department is further divided into sections, each of which is under the charge of a section officer. Apart from these sections, dealing with the subjects allotted to them, there are other offices sections, assigned with specific duties. When there is more than one secretary in a department, there shall be a clear separation of work.

Departments

 Agricultural Development and Farmers Welfare Department
 Animal Husbandry 
 Ayurveda, Yoga and Naturopathy, Unani, Siddha and Homeopathy (AYUSH)
 Archaeology Department
 Backward Classes Development Department
 Coastal Shipping and Inland Navigation
 Co-operation Department
 Consumer Affairs
 Cultural Affairs
 Environment
 Election
 Electronics & Information Department
 Excise Department 
 Finance Department
 Fisheries & Ports
 Forests and Wildlife Department
 Food and Civil Supplies Department
 General Education Department
 General Administration Department
 Higher Education Department

 Home Department
 Health and Family Welfare
 Housing Department
 Industries and Commerce Department
 Information & Public Relations Department
 Labour and Skills
 Law Department
 Local Self-Government Department
 Minority Welfare Department
 Non Resident Keralites Affairs (NORKA) Department
 Planning & Economic Affairs
 Personnel & Administrative Reforms
 Parliamentary Affairs
 Power Department
 Public Works Department
 Registration Department
 Revenue Department
 Science & Technology
 Social Justice Department
 Sports & Youth Affairs
 Scheduled Castes Development Department
 Scheduled Tribes Development Department
 Taxes
 Tourism Department
 Transport
 Vigilance
 Water Resources Department
 Women and Child Development
 Western Ghats Cell

State insignias 

The Kerala State Emblem is a derivative version of the royal coat of arms of the Kingdom of Travancore. The state emblem symbolises two elephants guarding the Imperial Shanku, or conch, in its imperial crest. This crest was the insignia of Lord Sree Padmanabha (a form of Lord Vishnu) - the national deity of Travancore. Shanku was considered one of the common emblems of a majority of the Kerala feudal kingdoms. The Kingdom of Cochin and Zamorin's Malabar also had conch as state emblems.  When the kingdoms of Cochin and Travancore merged in 1949, for a brief period, the crest carried a wheel or chakra in the centre with Shanku on top of it. With the accession of Malabar into Travancore-Cochin, the state of Kerala was formed in 1957. During this time, the royal coat of arms of the Travancore kingdom was modified by placing the "Lion Capital of Ashoka" on top of the imperial conch. The Travancore Royal Family uses the erstwhile Royal Coat of Arms of Travancore today, whereas Sree Padmanabhaswamy Temple of Trivandrum uses only the imperial conch crest as its coat of arms.

The state animal of Kerala is the elephant, and the government emblem has two elephants in it. The state bird is the great Indian hornbill (ML:മലമ്പുഴക്കി വേഴാമ്പല്‍).  The state flower is the golden shower (ML:കണിക്കൊന്ന), and the state tree is the coconut.  The state fish is the pearlspot or karimeen (കരിമീന്‍‌).

Elections 

Elections to the state assembly are held every five years. Elections are generally held for Parliament, State assembly and regional panchayats. Due to the large numbers of eligible voters, over 21 million, elections are usually held on several dates. Like all other Indian states, the minimum age of registration of a voter is 18 years.

Politics 

Kerala has a unique position in India as one of the most politicised states. It has the nation's largest politically aware population, which actively participates in state politics.

Politics in Kerala is dominated by two political fronts: the Communist Party of India (Marxist)-led Left Democratic Front (LDF) and the Indian National Congress-led United Democratic Front (UDF) since late 1970s. These two coalitions have alternated in power since 1982, although this pattern was broken in 2021. According to the 2021 Kerala Legislative Assembly election, the LDF has a majority in the state assembly (99/140).

The political alliance has strongly stabilised and, with rare exceptions, most of the coalition partners maintain loyalty to the alliance. As a result of this, power has alternated between these two fronts since 1979.

In terms of individual parties, the state has strong leanings towards socialism and thus Communist parties have made strong inroads in Kerala. The Malabar region, particularly Kannur and Palakkad, are considered the heartland of the Communist parties. The Kollam and Alapuzha districts, where trade unions have a strong presence, are generally inclined to Left parties, though several times the UDF has won. The CPI(M) led LDF did a clean sweep of 11–0 over UDF and NDA in Kollam district during 2016 Local body election. The largest Communist party is the CPIM and the second largest is the CPI.

The Indian National Congress, which leads the UDF coalition, has had a very strong presence in Kerala since pre-Independence days. The Congress party has great popularity in the Thrissur, Ernakulam, Kottayam, Pathanamthitta and Thiruvananthapuram regions, whereas it has a strong influence in some parts of Idukki regions.

The Bharatiya Janata Party (the Party that currently leads the Government of India) is also active in Kerala, but is not part of either coalition. It does not have any elected Parliament member, and has lost its one Legislative Assembly member in the 2021 Kerala Legislative Assembly election and selected members in all the Corporations, several Municipal Councils and a large number of Local Panchayats. The party enjoys popularity in the districts of Thiruvananthapuram and Kasaragod.

Other popular regional parties are:
 The Kerala Congress, which has more than four denominations after breaking away from the original party. It has strong influence among settlement populations in hilly regions. The various Kerala Congress denominations are primarily patronized by the Syrian Christian community and Nair populations, mostly in Central Travancore areas like Kottayam, Idukki and Pathanamthitta. Today, most of Kerala Congress parties are with the UDF.
 The Indian Union Muslim League is a powerful pro-Muslim community-oriented party, which was started as the Muslim League prior to Independence, yet decided to transfer their allegiance to the Indian Union after Independence, when the original Muslim League went to Pakistan. The IUML-Kerala unit is the only Muslim League group to declare its allegiance and loyalty to India and hence become a state party in post-Independence India. The party has strongholds mostly in Muslim-dominated districts like Kozhikode, Malappuram and Kasargod. They form the second largest party within the UDF.
 Socialist groups, consisting of several small fragmented parties like the NCP, SJD-S, JDS, and Congress-S, are mainly centre-left socialist parties having very limited influence in a few pocket areas. Most of the socialist groups are with the LDF, though in a few instances, some of them changed their loyalties to the UDF.
 Communist parties consist of various groups which have broken away from the CPIM. They are mostly centre-left parties, though a few are extreme-left. While a few centre-left parties like the RSP have joined with the UDF, those that broke away from the CPIM, like the CMP and JSS, led by erstwhile CPIM veterans who were expelled from CPIM, have joined with the UDF.
 The Bharath Dharma Jana Sena or BDJS is a new political party formed in 2015 led by Thushar Vellapally. The party's primary vote base is among Ezhava and Thiyya community. It is politically and ideologically aligned towards the BJP and is a part of National Democratic Alliance.

Awards and honours
Kerala was declared as the first complete digitally administered state of India on 27 February 2016. The India Corruption Survey 2019 by Transparency International declared Kerala the least-corrupt state in India. The state topped in the country to achieve the Sustainable Development Goals according to the annual report of NITI Aayog published in 2019. The Public Affairs Index-2020 released by the Public Affairs Centre, India, designated Kerala as the best governed Indian state.

References

Further reading

External links 
 

Government of Kerala